The 2000–01 Icelandic Hockey League season was the tenth season of the Icelandic Hockey League, the top level of ice hockey in Iceland. Four teams participated in the league, and Skautafelag Akureyrar won the championship.

Regular season

Final 
 Skautafélag Akureyrar - Ísknattleiksfélagið Björninn 3:2 (3:4, 5:6, 11:4, 5:1, 6:5)

External links 
 2000-01 season

Icelandic Hockey League
Icelandic Hockey League seasons
2000–01 in Icelandic ice hockey